Ypsilon Scheme is a free software implementation of the R6RS standard of Scheme. It implements mostly concurrent garbage collection, which is optimized for multi-core CPU systems.  Its author, Yoshikatsu Fujita, developed the Ypsilon implementation to satisfy the need for a real-time Scheme implementation suitable for computer game development without giving up a garbage collected dynamic interpreter.

External links 

Source code repository

Scheme (programming language) implementations
Scheme (programming language) interpreters
Free compilers and interpreters
R6RS Scheme